"Listen" is a song by the American band Collective Soul. It is the second single from their third studio album, Disciplined Breakdown.

Charts

References

1997 singles
1997 songs
Atlantic Records singles
Collective Soul songs
Songs written by Ed Roland